Contingency or Contingent may refer to:

 Contingency (philosophy), in philosophy and logic
 Contingency plan, in planning
 Contingency (electrical grid), in electrical grid engineering
 Contingency table, in statistics
 Contingency theory, in organizational theory
 Contingency theory (biology) in evolutionary biology
 Contingency management, in medicine
 Contingent claim, in finance
 Contingent fee, in commercial matters
 Contingent liability, in law
 Contingent vote, in politics
 Contingent work, an employment relationship
 Cost contingency, in business risk management
 "Contingency" (Prison Break), a television series episode
 Military contingent, a group within an army.

See also 
 Contractual term, upon which agreed outcomes are contingent